JB and the Moonshine Band is an American Texas country group from East Texas composed of JB Patterson, Gabe Guevara, Hayden McMullen and Chris Flores. In 2010, they signed to Colt Ford's record label, Average Joe's Entertainment. Their 2012 album Beer for Breakfast charted on the Billboard Top Country Albums chart.

History
In early 2009, front man JB Patterson, lead vocalist, songwriter and rhythm guitarist for the band, gave up his advertising career to pursue his dream of being a songwriter, and listed an open casting call for musicians in his community.  Turnout for the audition was small; only three people showed up, but three was enough.  Gabe Guevara, Hayden McMullen and Chris Flores were immediately dubbed "the Moonshine Band."  After their first show at a local honky-tonk, JB and the boys began touring, and with a jury-rigged PA system and a rented U-Haul van, the band travelled through East Texas, quickly gaining a local following.

The group’s big break came while opening for Average Joe's Entertainment artist Colt Ford in March 2010.  The band’s country sound and outlaw attitude immediately caught the attention of Colt’s team in Nashville, TN, and in July 2010 JB and the Moonshine Band signed a record deal with Average Joe's Entertainment. Label mates include country singer/songwriter Colt Ford, American Idol finalist Josh Gracin, and award winning country duo Montgomery Gentry.  The band’s debut album, “Ain’t Goin' Back to Jail” premiered in September 2010, with Gabe Guevara on drums, Hayden McMullen on lead guitar, Chris Flores on bass guitar and JB providing lead vocals, banjo, and acoustic guitar.  JB also serves as the band’s lyricist, writing all of the songs on the record.

JB and the Moonshine Band's second album, "Beer For Breakfast" was released March 6, 2012 and charted on Billboard.

Notable accomplishments
The first single from the Ain't Goin' Back to Jail debut album was "Perfect Girl" and was the fasting-raising debut single in 2010 and is the #1 Most Requested Song on XM Nashville 11, with over 2,300 digital sales a week. The single has gained over 1,090,000 YouTube views and has already sold over 50,000 paid single downloads on iTunes. Currently, the band's YouTube channel has had over 2,000,000 views.

The music video for "Perfect Girl" was also featured on CMT Pure's 12 Pack for months and peaked at #7. It was later nominated for CMT's Top 30 Videos of 2011.

The second single from their debut album, "Whiskey Days" peaked at #7 on Billboard's Texas Regional Radio Report.  The third single, "Love Don't Let You Decide" peaked at #15 on the Texas Regional Radio Report.

In 2011, JB and the Moonshine Band were nominated for two awards at the Texas Radio Report Awards for "Best Video" and "Best New Group."

JB Patterson co-wrote the #1 hit single "Double-Wide Dream" on the Texas Regional Radio Report for the week of January 15.  The single was cowritten with the frontman from Casey Donahew Band of Texas.  The video for the single has recently been played on CMT's show "High 5" which features the top five most played songs on CMT.com.

The sophomore album, "Beer For Breakfast" debuted at No. 4 on iTunes Country Albums day of its release, March 6.  The album debuted at No. 31 on Billboard's Country Chart, No. 31 on Billboard's Independent Albums and at No. 7 on Billboard's Heatseekers Chart.

The third album Mixtape was released on June 30, 2015. It debuted on the Top Country Albums chart at No. 33, selling 2,600 copies for the week.

Discography

Studio albums

Singles

Guest singles

Music videos

References

External links
 Official Website
 Official Facebook Page
 Official YouTube Channel
 Average Joes Entertainment
 LEX Music Group, LLC

Country music groups from Texas
Average Joes Entertainment artists
Musical groups established in 2009